The following is a list of notable video game console emulators.

Arcade
 Visual Pinball

Atari
 Atari 2600
 Stella

Nintendo

Home consoles
 Nintendo Entertainment System
 FCEUX
 NESticle
 Nestopia
 Super NES
 Snes9x
 ZSNES
 Nintendo 64
 Mupen64Plus
 Project64
 Project Unreality
 UltraHLE
 GameCube/Wii
 Dolphin
 Wii U
 Cemu

Handhelds
 Game Boy
 Wzonka-Lad
 Game Boy Advance
 VisualBoyAdvance (Also supports Game Boy and Game Boy Color)
 Nintendo 3DS
 Citra

Hybrid
 Nintendo Switch

 Yuzu

SNK
Neo Geo CD
NeoCD

Sony

Home consoles

 PlayStation
 AdriPSX
 bleem!
 bleemcast!
 Connectix Virtual Game Station
 ePSXe
 PCSX-Reloaded
 PlayStation 2
 PCSX2
 PlayStation 3
 RPCS3

Handhelds
 PlayStation Portable
 PPSSPP

Frontends
 RetroArch

Multi-system emulators

Multi-system emulators are capable of emulating the functionality of multiple systems.

 higan
 MAME (Multiple Arcade Machine Emulator)
 Mednafen
 MESS (Multi Emulator Super System), formerly a stand-alone application and now part of MAME
 OpenEmu

See also

 Emulator
 List of computer system emulators
 List of emulators
 Video game console emulator

References

Emulators, Video game
Emulators